The Ambassador Extraordinary and Plenipotentiary of the Russian Federation to the People's Democratic Republic of Algeria is the official representative of the President and the Government of the Russian Federation to the President and the Government of Algeria.

The ambassador and his staff work at large in the Embassy of Russia in Algiers. There is a consulate general in Annaba.

History of diplomatic relations

Diplomatic relations between the Soviet Union and Algeria were established on 23 March 1962.   was appointed ambassador on 11 November 1962. With the dissolution of the Soviet Union in 1991, the Soviet ambassador, continued as representative of the Russian Federation until 1995.

List of representatives (1962 – present)

Representatives of the Soviet Union to Algeria (1962 – 1991)

Representatives of the Russian Federation to Algeria (1991 – present)

References

External links 
  Embassy of Russia to Algeria

 
Algeria
Russia